Luke Hemmerich (born 9 February 1998) is a German footballer who plays as a left-back for  club SpVgg Bayreuth.

Career statistics

References

External links
 
 

1998 births
Living people
Footballers from Essen
German footballers
Germany youth international footballers
Association football fullbacks
FC Schalke 04 players
VfL Bochum players
FC Erzgebirge Aue players
FC Energie Cottbus players
Würzburger Kickers players
SC Preußen Münster players
SpVgg Bayreuth players
2. Bundesliga players
3. Liga players